Cwmtawe Community School (in Welsh: Ysgol Gymunedol Cwmtawe) Formerly known as Pontardawe Technical School and Cwmtawe Comprehensive School, is a modern English-medium education comprehensive school in Pontardawe, South Wales.

The school moved to newly built premises in 1996. Its old building was used by the local Welsh-language primary school, Ysgol Gynradd Gymraeg Pontardawe, until it was demolished in 2010. Cwmtawe recently won an award for environmentally friendly schools, based on school improvements, community and curriculum links, saving money, and raising environmental awareness. Although Cwmtawe is not a Welsh-medium school, Welsh is taught at second-language level, as it is mandatory under the National Curriculum that all Welsh school children up to age 16 be taught the language.

Cwmtawe has very good Key Stage 3 and GCSE results exceeding the targets set in Wales's national standards. In 2000, it was in 113th place in Wales for GCSE passes (based on 5 GCSEs, grades A*-C). Since then, examination results have improved dramatically; according to the latest inspection report by Estyn, the school has a GCSE pass rate of 73%, putting it in 12th place and within the top 10% of all schools in Wales.

Feeder primary schools
The feeder primary schools for Cwmtawe are:
 Alltwen Primary School
 Godre'r Graig Primary School
 Llangiwg Primary School
 Rhos Primary School
 Rhydyfro Primary School
 Tairgwaith Primary School

Notable former pupils
Bleddyn Bowen, rugby union player
Aled Brew, rugby union player
Loren Dykes, football player
Gareth Edwards, rugby union player
James Griffiths, rugby union player
Robert Jones, rugby union player
Sir Clive Lewis, Court of Appeal Judge
Elgan Rees, rugby union player
Arwel Thomas, rugby union player
Justin Tipuric, rugby union player
Lewy Williams, professional darts player

External links
Cwmtawe Community School's website
Neath Port Talbot County Borough Council Education Page

References

Secondary schools in Neath Port Talbot
Educational institutions established in 1969
1969 establishments in Wales